Milan Mikuláš (born 1 April 1963 in Trnava) is a retired triple jumper who represented Czechoslovakia during his active career. His personal best jump is 17.53 metres, achieved in July 1988 in Prague. This is the current Czech record.  His personal best in long jump is 8.25 metres.

He won the bronze medal at the 1989 European Indoor Championships in Athletics and finished fifth at the 1989 IAAF World Indoor Championships. He also competed at the 1991 IAAF World Indoor Championships and the 1993 World Championships without reaching the final.

International competitions

1No mark in the final

References

1963 births
Living people
Czech male triple jumpers
Czechoslovak male triple jumpers
Athletes (track and field) at the 1988 Summer Olympics
Athletes (track and field) at the 1992 Summer Olympics
Olympic athletes of Czechoslovakia
World Athletics Championships athletes for the Czech Republic
Sportspeople from Trnava